Hallo Ü-Wagen (Hello Radio Van) was a German travelling talk radio show of the WDR. It was presented and directed weekly by Carmen Thomas from 1974 to 1994. In 1990, Forbes named her one of the 100 most influential women in Germany for running it. The series continued until 2010.

History 
Carmen Thomas began directing and presenting Hallo Ü-Wagen in 1974. The radio van travelled weekly as a "show on wheels" to different locations, where topics suggested by listeners were discussed with experts in live interviews, with the audience at the location and with listeners via telephone.

First broadcast on 5 December 1974, the show was aired regularly each Thursday from 9:20 a.m. to noon on WDR 2. From January  1995, it was aired by WDR 5, first at the same time, then on Saturday from 11:05 a.m. to 1:00 p.m. Thomas was followed by Jan Seemann from 1995, and by Julitta Münch from September 1997.

The series continued until 18 December 2010. Afterwards, only individual presentations of the format were aired for specific occasions.

Format 

For each broadcast, a radio van (Übertragungswagen, abbreviated Ü-Wagen) of the public broadcaster Westdeutscher Rundfunk (WDR) travelled to a place in North Rhine-Westphalia, often a town, for a live broadcast. The van was nicknamed Violetta because of its colour. A presenter moderated the airing, dedicated to a topic which was normally chosen by the listeners, but sometimes was changed due to political events. Depending on the theme, experts and involved people were invited, sometimes well-known personalities in society, politics and sports.

Each airing began with the reading of feedback to previous broadcasts. After the presenter introduced the new topic in dialogue with people who came to the van's location, the invited experts and guests were introduced and asked to comment on the topic, leading to a discussion among the experts, the live audience and the radio listeners by telephone. Occasionally, live music became part of the airing. The broadcast was interrupted for news.

Legacy 
Forbes magazine named Thomas one of the 100 most influential women in Germany in 1990 for Hallo Ü-Wagen. , a WDR moderator, called her journalistic work in Hallo Ü-Wagen a model for his live interview series .

References 

German talk radio programs
1974 radio programme debuts
Westdeutscher Rundfunk
2010 radio programme endings